Alistair Oluwashaun Smith (born 19 May 1999) is an English professional footballer who plays as a midfielder for Sutton United.

Career
A product of Mansfield Town's academy, Smith spent loan spells at Loughborough Dynamo and Frickley Athletic. He made his first-team debut for Mansfield on 13 November 2018, in the Football League Trophy, and signed a new 18-month contract with the club in January 2019. He made his first appearance of the 2019–20 season on 13 August 2019, in the EFL Cup. He joined Kettering Town on a one-month loan on 31 January 2020.

In November 2020 he moved on loan to National League side Altrincham. After making eleven league appearances for the Robins, Smith joined Altrincham on a permanent basis on 15 January 2021 by signing an 18-month contract with the club. He returned to the Football League with newly promoted Sutton United in July 2021.

References

1999 births
Living people
English footballers
Association football midfielders
Mansfield Town F.C. players
Loughborough Dynamo F.C. players
Frickley Athletic F.C. players
Kettering Town F.C. players
Altrincham F.C. players
Sutton United F.C. players
English Football League players
National League (English football) players